Gangkou is a district of the city of Fangchenggang, Guangxi, China.

County-level divisions of Guangxi
Fangchenggang